Gimnasio Manuel Bernardo Aguirre is an indoor arena in Chihuahua, Chihuahua, Mexico. It is primarily used for basketball and it's the home arena of the Dorados de Chihuahua of the Liga Nacional de Baloncesto Profesional (LNBP). It has also hosted Professional Bull Riders, World Wrestling Entertainment, and concert events. It was inaugurated on 2 October 1980 and has a capacity of 10,530 people.

References

Manuel Bernardo Aguirre
Volleyball venues in Mexico
Basketball venues in Mexico
Sports venues in Chihuahua (state)
Chihuahua City